Nanpeng Islands are a chain of islands located in the north of South China Sea, administered by Nan'ao County, Shantou, Guangdong, the People's Republic of China. The were formerly known to foreigners as the Lamock Islands. Nanpeng Islands consist of six islands: Nanpeng Island, Zhongpeng Island, Dingpeng Island (also known as Dongpeng Island or Yazaiyu Island), Qinpeng Island, Chizaiyu Island and Qiweiyu Island. Nanpeng Islands have two baseline points of the Chinese territorial sea.

No resident lives in the Nanpeng Islands except garrison of the People's Liberation Army. It became a National Marine Ecological Nature Reserve in 2012, as well as a Ramsar site in 2015.

Islands

Landmarks
 Guoxing Well (Koxin Well): dug by Zheng Chenggong (Koxinga) in 1659 at Zhongpeng Island.
 Nanpeng Lighthouse: a 22.8 meter-high lighthouse at the top of Nanpeng Island.

See also 
Battle of Nanpeng Archipelago

References

Islands of Guangdong
Baselines of the Chinese territorial sea
Islands of the South China Sea
Ramsar sites in China